Rashard Robinson (born July 23, 1995) is an American football cornerback who is a free agent. He played college football at LSU, and was drafted by the San Francisco 49ers in the fourth round of the 2016 NFL Draft.

Early years
Robinson was born in Pompano Beach, Florida, where he attended Blanche Ely High School.

College career
Robinson attended Louisiana State University, where he played two seasons of college football for the LSU Tigers under head coach Les Miles. He recorded one interception and 30 tackles in 15 games.

Robinson was suspended indefinitely from LSU's football team midway through the 2014 season due to a failed drug test and substandard academics. After missing a semester, he was arrested in June 2015 for unauthorized entry into a teammate's apartment and was not allowed to re-enroll. He returned to Florida and enrolled at Broward College in Fort Lauderdale, where he began training for the NFL Draft.

Professional career
Coming out of LSU, Robinson was by the majority of NFL draft experts and scouts to be a fourth or fifth round pick. He received an invitation to the NFL combine and boasted he would run a 4.2 forty-yard dash. Robinson's performance was sub-par and he elected to skip the bench press and wasn't able to complete the short shuttle or three-cone drill after suffering a calf injury. On March 14, 2016, he attended LSU's Pro Day, but held a private workout afterwards due to his tumultuous past with the team. All 32 NFL teams were in attendance as Robinson opted to complete all of the combine and positional drills. He was able to shorten his times in the 40 (4.40), 20 (2.61), and 10-yard dash (1.60) from the combine. Robinson was ranked as the 16th best cornerback prospect in the draft by NFLDraftScout.com. NFL analysts and scouts cited his thin frame, off the field problems, spindly legs, and character concerns were cited as his top issues. Robinson was considered to be one of the top press corners in the draft and was described in scouting reports as a player with a long frame and great man coverage ability.  He also has blazing straight line speed 
and explosiveness.

San Francisco 49ers

2016
The San Francisco 49ers selected Robinson in the fourth round (133rd overall) of the 2016 NFL Draft. He was one of three cornerbacks the 49ers selected in the 2016 NFL Draft, along with Will Redmond (third round) and Prince Charles Iworah (seventh round). On May 6, 2016, the 49ers signed Robinson to a four-year, $2.72 million contract a signing bonus of $383,393.

He competed with Kenneth Acker, Keith Reaser, Dontae Johnson, Marcus Cromartie, Chris Davis, Will Redmond, and Prince Charles Iworah throughout training camp for a role as the backup cornerback. Head coach Chip Kelly named him the fifth cornerback on the depth chart to begin the season, behind Tramaine Brock, Jimmie Ward, Chris Davis, and Dontae Johnson.

He made his professional regular season debut during the 49ers' season-opening 28–0 victory over the Los Angeles Rams. The next game, he made his first career tackle during the 49ers' 27–46 loss to the Carolina Panthers. On October 2, 2016, Robinson earned the first start of his career in place of Jimmie Ward, who suffered a quad injury during a special teams play the week prior. Robinson made five solo tackles and a season-high three pass deflections in his first start, as the 49ers lost 17–24 to the Dallas Cowboys. During Week 6 matchup against the Buffalo Bills, he made his third start and tied his season-high of five solo tackles as the 49ers lost 16–45. He left midway through the game after suffering a concussion. Robinson was forced to miss Weeks 9-10 after he suffered an MCL sprain. On December 24, 2016, Robinson made a solo tackle, deflected two passes, and had the first interception of his career after he picked off a pass attempt from Rams' quarterback Jared Goff in a 22–21 victory. He finished his rookie season with a total of 28 combined tackles (25 solo), 8 pass deflections, and 1 interception in 14 games and 6 starts.

2017
Robinson entered training camp competing for one of the vacant starting cornerback jobs after Jimmie Ward was moved to free safety and Tramaine Brock was released following a domestic violence incident. He competed with Dontae Johnson, Keith Reaser, Ahkello Witherspoon, and K'Waun Williams throughout training camp. Head coach Kyle Shanahan named him the starting cornerback opposite Dontae Johnson to begin the  season.

Robinson started the 49ers' season-opener against the Carolina Panthers and recorded four combined tackles and recovered a fumble after forcing it from Christian McCaffrey in the fourth quarter in a 3–23 loss. During a Week 4 contest against the Arizona Cardinals, he recorded a season-high six solo tackles and a season-high four pass deflections, as the 49ers lost in overtime 15–18. On October 15, 2017, Robinson recorded two combined tackles, defended a pass, and intercepted a pass attempt from Washington Redskins' quarterback Kirk Cousins, during a 24–26 loss.

New York Jets
On October 31, 2017, Robinson was traded to the New York Jets in exchange for a fifth round pick in the 2018 NFL Draft. The Jets traded for Robinson to provide depth to a cornerback corps after Buster Skrine suffered a concussion, Morris Claiborne was unable to practice due to a foot injury, and Xavier Coleman was placed on injured/reserve for the remainder of the season with a shoulder injury.

On July 25, 2018, Robinson was suspended the first four games of 2018 for violating the NFL Policy and Program for Substances of Abuse.

On May 10, 2019, Robinson was released by the Jets. He was suspended for the first 10 weeks of the 2019 NFL season for violating the league's substance abuse policy on July 17, 2019. He was reinstated from suspension on March 19, 2020.

Dallas Cowboys
On September 15, 2020, Robinson was signed to the Dallas Cowboys practice squad. He was placed on the practice squad/injured list on October 24, and restored to the practice squad on November 18. He was elevated to the active roster on November 21 and November 26 for the team's weeks 11 and 12 games against the Minnesota Vikings and Washington Football Team, and reverted to the practice squad after each game. He was promoted to the active roster on December 7, 2020.

Robinson was suspended by the NFL on April 20, 2021, for the first two games of the 2021 season for violating the league's performance-enhancing drug policy. He was released by the Cowboys on July 17, 2021.

Tampa Bay Buccaneers
After serving his two-game suspension, Robinson signed with the Tampa Bay Buccaneers' practice squad on September 20, 2021. He was promoted to the active roster on October 19. He was placed on injured reserve on November 12, after suffering a hamstring injury in practice. He was activated on December 24. He was waived on January 15, 2022 and re-signed to the practice squad. After the Buccaneers were eliminated in the Divisional Round of the 2021 playoffs, he signed a reserve/future contract on January 24.

On August 30, 2022, Robinson was placed on injured reserve. He was released on September 2.

Legal troubles
Robinson was suspended indefinitely from LSU's football team midway through the 2014 season due to a failed drug test and substandard academics. After missing a semester, he was arrested in June 2015 for unauthorized entry into a teammate's apartment and was not allowed to re-enroll. He returned to Florida and enrolled at Broward College in Fort Lauderdale, where he began training for the NFL Draft. On January 10, 2018, Robinson was arrested for possessing marijuana-laced candy. On July 25, 2018, Robinson was suspended for four games as a result of these prior arrests.

References

External links
 LSU Tigers bio

1995 births
Living people
American football cornerbacks
Blanche Ely High School alumni
Dallas Cowboys players
LSU Tigers football players
New York Jets players
People from Pompano Beach, Florida
Players of American football from Florida
San Francisco 49ers players
Sportspeople from Broward County, Florida
Tampa Bay Buccaneers players
Broward College alumni